Guy Lauzon (born April 6, 1944) is a Canadian politician who served as the Member of Parliament for the riding of Stormont—Dundas—South Glengarry from 2004 to 2019 as a member of the Conservative Party.

Background

Lauzon was born in St. Andrew's West, Ontario and his family roots in the region can be traced to the 19th century.

Lauzon spent over twenty-two years in the federal public service and served as a local union president of the Public Service Alliance of Canada.  During the 1990s, he served as chair of the HDRC's United Way and multiple sclerosis research funding campaigns.  He retired in 1993, and is now the general manager of Tri-County Protein, a soybean processing plant in Winchester, Ontario.  Lauzon has also served as fundraising chairman of the St. Andrews West Roman Catholic Church, which raised over $100,000 for the building's restoration.

Federal politics

In the 2000 federal election, Lauzon ran as the Canadian Alliance candidate in Stormont—Dundas—Charlottenburgh, and finished second behind incumbent Liberal Bob Kilger.

38th Parliament

The Canadian Alliance and Progressive Conservative Party were merged in 2003, and Lauzon ran as a Conservative in the 2004 election and garnered almost 4,000 votes more than his nearest rival, incumbent Bob Kilger.

Lauzon was appointed as the Conservative Party critic for the Treasury Board and Official Languages Committee.

39th Parliament

In the 2006 federal election, Lauzon was chosen once more to represent the Conservative Party as the candidate for Stormont—Dundas—South Glengarry. He won 54.7% of the popular vote, defeating his nearest challenger, Tom Manley, by over 14,000 votes. It was the Conservatives fourth largest victory in Ontario in terms of popular support.

In 2006, Guy Lauzon was appointed to the deputy whip position of the Conservative party.

In the spring of 2007, Guy Lauzon was ousted from his position as the Official Languages Committee chair in a non-confidence vote (by all three opposition parties) for cancelling a scheduled meeting moments before witnesses were to testify. The hearing was being held to examine the cancellation of a Court Challenges Program, to which the government cut funding. The Conservative government then, following procedures from what the media has dubbed the "obstruction manual," decided not to nominate a new chair, shutting down the committee's work.

On October 10, 2007 Lauzon was appointed Parliamentary Secretary to the Minister of Agriculture and Agri-Food and for the Federal Economic Development Initiative for Northern Ontario.

40th Parliament

On November 3, 2008, almost a month following that year's federal election, Lauzon was appointed Chairman of the Conservative Caucus, succeeding defeated Alberta MP Rahim Jaffer.

41st Parliament

Lauzon introduced a bill, C-350, which would ensure any monetary awards owed to an offender as a result of legal action are first used to resolve financial obligations to victims and family members, such as child support dues.

42nd Parliament

Lauzon announced on January 26, 2019 that he would not be running in the 2019 election.

Electoral record

References

External links

1944 births
Canadian Roman Catholics
Conservative Party of Canada MPs
Franco-Ontarian people
Living people
Members of the House of Commons of Canada from Ontario
People from the United Counties of Stormont, Dundas and Glengarry
21st-century Canadian politicians